The Lee Kong Chian School of Medicine is the medical school of the Nanyang Technological University. The school was established in 2013 as Singapore's third medical school, after the Yong Loo Lin School of Medicine and the Duke–NUS Medical School. It is a collaboration between Nanyang Technological University and Imperial College London.

Dual campus

Novena 
The main campus of Lee Kong Chian School of Medicine is located in Novena, situated next to the institution's partner hospital, Tan Tock Seng Hospital. The 20-storey Clinical Sciences Building, which commenced construction in January 2015, was opened on 2 March 2017 and facilitates both classroom as well as clinical teaching of medicine. The Clinical Sciences Building also houses various research labs, and students are welcome to apply for attachments with them.

Experimental Medicine Building 
The faculty's first building, the Experimental Medicine Building, opened in August 2015 and houses classrooms as well as several research labs. Situated within the main Nanyang Technological University campus grounds, it allows students to interact with other faculties more frequently, before they move on to the clinical years of medical school.

References

External links

Programme Website

Nanyang Technological University
Medical schools in Singapore
Educational institutions established in 2013
2013 establishments in Singapore
Organisations associated with Imperial College London